Imitiaz Qureshi is an Indian chef and the master chef at ITC Hotels, known for creating the culinary brand of Bukhara and reviving the Dum Pukht tradition of cuisine. He has served several official banquets hosted by the Prime Minister and the President of India.

Career
Qureshi was born on 2 February 1931 in a family of chefs in Lucknow in the Indian state of Uttar Pradesh, Qureshi started his culinary career with his uncle before joining Krishna Caterers, a catering company which served the Indian Army during the Sino-Indian War of 1962. After working at a few local restaurants, he joined ITC Hotels in 1979 and served the hospitality chain at several of their locations such as Clark Hotel, Lucknow and Maurya Sheraton, Delhi before becoming the master chef of the group. The Government of India awarded him the fourth highest civilian honour of the Padma Shri, in 2016, for his contributions to culinary art, thus making him the first chef to receive the honor. He has five sons and two daughters, Aisha Qureshi, Ishtiyaque Qureshi, Ashfaque Qureshi, Irfan Qureshi, Yasmin Qureshi, Imran Qureshi & Muhammad Ahsan Ali Qureshi, are also in the culinary business and have restaurants in Indian and abroad.

See also 
 Tarla Dalal

References

External links 
 

Recipients of the Padma Shri in other fields
Indian chefs
1931 births
Businesspeople from Lucknow
Chefs of Indian cuisine
Living people